The Uruguayan Film Commission is the national film commission of Uruguay, which aims to promote Uruguay locations for foreign productions, and to provide international exposure for national productions.

References

External links
Official site

Film commissions
Film organizations in Uruguay